Just for Love is the fourth album by American psychedelic rock band Quicksilver Messenger Service. Released in August 1970, it marks the culmination of a transition from the extended, blues- and jazz-inspired improvisations of their first two albums to a more traditional rock sound. Founding member Dino Valenti, who returned to the band after a stint in prison on drug charges, was largely responsible for the new sound. Valenti's influence is readily apparent throughout; he composed eight of the album's nine tracks under the pen name Jesse Oris Farrow. Despite the marked change in the band's sound, it was their third straight album to reach the Top 30 on the Billboard charts, peaking at number 27. The only single culled from the album, "Fresh Air", became the band's biggest hit, reaching number 49.

Track listing
All songs written by Jesse Oris Farrow, except where noted.

Side one
"Wolf Run (Part 1)" – 1:12
"Just for Love (Part 1)" – 3:00
"Cobra" (John Cipollina) – 4:23
"The Hat" – 10:36

Side two
"Freeway Flyer" – 3:49
"Gone Again" – 7:17
"Fresh Air" – 5:21
"Just for Love (Part 2)" – 1:38
"Wolf Run (Part 2)" – 2:10

Personnel
 Dino Valenti – guitar, lead vocals, flute, conga
 Gary Duncan – guitar, backing vocals, bass, maracas, wood block
 John Cipollina –  steel, slide and electric guitars, backing vocals
 David Freiberg – bass, backing vocals, guitar
 Greg Elmore – drums, percussion
 Nicky Hopkins – piano

Charts
Album

Single

References

Quicksilver Messenger Service albums
1970 albums
Capitol Records albums